Albert Jay "A. J." English (born July 11, 1967) is a retired American professional basketball player who played two seasons in the National Basketball Association (NBA). He is also the father of current player A. J. English III.

College
English played Basketball for Howard High School of Technology from 1983 to 1986.  The team was State Champions in 1985 and he received the Delaware High School Player of the Year in 1986.  He played for Virginia Union University from 1986 to 1990.  English was named the NCAA Division II National Player of the Year in 1990

NBA career
He was selected by the Washington Bullets in the 2nd round (37th overall) of the 1990 NBA draft. English played two seasons for the Bullets, averaging 9.9 points per game.

English signed a contract with Portland Trail Blazers on October 1, 1993. He was placed on waivers on November 2, 1993, and did not play in the NBA again.

Career highlights and awards
The Delaware Sports Museum and Hall of Fame inducted English in 2004.

External links
NBA stats @ basketballreference.com

1967 births
Living people
African-American basketball players
American expatriate basketball people in France
American expatriate basketball people in Greece
American expatriate basketball people in Italy
American expatriate basketball people in Spain
American expatriate basketball people in Turkey
American men's basketball players
Aris B.C. players
Basketball players from Wilmington, Delaware
Beşiktaş men's basketball players
Liga ACB players
Olimpia Basket Pistoia players
Pallacanestro Trieste players
Pallacanestro Virtus Roma players
Paris Racing Basket players
Rapid City Thrillers players
Richmond Rhythm players
Rochester Renegade players
Shooting guards
Virginia Union Panthers men's basketball players
Washington Bullets draft picks
Washington Bullets players
21st-century African-American people
20th-century African-American sportspeople